The Karen or Karenic languages are tonal languages spoken by some 4.5 million Karen people. They are of unclear affiliation within the Sino-Tibetan languages.  The Karen languages are written using the Karen script. The three main branches are Sgaw, Pwo and Pa'O. Karenni (also known as Kayah or Red Karen) and Kayan (also known as Padaung) are a branch of Karen languages. They are unusual among the Sino-Tibetan languages in having a subject–verb–object word order; other than Karen, Bai and the Chinese languages, Sino-Tibetan languages have a subject–object–verb order. This is likely due to influence from neighboring Mon and Tai languages.

Classification
Because they differ from other Tibeto-Burman languages in morphology and syntax, Benedict (1972: 2–4, 129) removed the Karen languages from Tibeto-Burman in a Tibeto-Karen branch, but this is no longer accepted.

A common geographical classification distinguishes three groups:
Northern
Pa’o
Central
The area of greatest diversity, including Kayah (Red Karen or Karenni), Kayaw (Brek), Bwe (Bghai), Geba and many more.
Southern
Pwo and Sgaw
Kayan (Padaung) is transitional between the northern and central groups.
The languages with the most speakers are Sgaw, Pwo and Pa’o.

Manson (2011)
Manson (2011) classifies the Karen languages as follows, with each primary branch characterized by phonological innovations:
Karen
Peripheral: proto-voiceless stop initials appearing as aspirated stops (e.g. *p > pʰ)
Pa’o
Pwo
Northern: merger of nasal finals (e.g. *am, *an > aɴ), merger of stop-final rhymes with the open counterpart (e.g. *aʔ, *a > a)
Kayan
Lahta
Yinbaw
Yintale
Central: vowel raising (e.g. *a > ɛ)
Western Kayah, Eastern Kayah
Geba, Bwe
Paku (?)
Geker, Gekho (?; may be Central or Southern)
Kayaw, Manu (?; may be Central or Southern)
Southern: merger of nasal-final rhymes, with the rhyme subsequently raised (e.g. *am, *aŋ > ɔ)
Sgaw, Paku
Dermuha, Palaychi
The classifications of Geker, Gekho, Kayaw, and Manu are ambiguous, as they may be either Central or Southern.

Shintani (2012)
Shintani Tadahiko (2012:x) gives the following tentative classification, proposed in 2002, for what he calls the "Brakaloungic" languages, of which Karen is a branch. Individual languages are marked in italics.

Brakaloungic
Pao
Pao
Karen
Kayah-Padaung
Kayah
Pado-Thaido-Gekho
Thaidai
Pado-Gekho
Gekho
Padaung
Padaung (Kayan)
Gekho (Yathu Gekho)
Bwe
Bweba-Kayaw
Kayaw
Bweba
Geba
Bwe
Sgaw-Pwo
Pwo
Mobwa
Mopwa
Blimaw
Pako-Sgaw
Sgaw
Pakubwa
Paku
Monebwa
Thalebwa

However, at the time of publication, Shintani (2012) reports that there are more than 40 Brakaloungic languages and/or dialects, many of which have only been recently reported and documented. Shintani also reports that Mon influence is present in all Brakaloungic languages, while some also have significant Burmese and Shan influence.

The Kayan languages are spoken in Kayah State, southern Shan State, and northern Karen State. There are four branches according to Shintani (2016), namely Kangan ("lowland dwellers"), Kakhaung ("highland dwellers"), Lawi ("South"), and Latha ("North"). Nangki (sometimes called Langki), documented in Shintani (2016), is one of the Kayan languages belonging to the Kakhaung subgroup. It is spoken only in one village.

Kadaw is spoken in Kayah State, and has nasalized vowels but no final nasal consonants. It has more Burmese than Shan influence. Thamidai is yet another Karenic language.

Below is a classification of the Karenic languages by Hsiu (2019) based on a phylogenetic analysis of Shintani's published lexical data. The results support the overall structure of Shintani's (2012) classification.

Karenic
Pa'o
Northern
Southern
Karen
Kayan (Padaungic)
Kayin Phyu
Yathu Gekho
Thaidai
Padaung cluster: Padaung, Yinbaw, Kangan ("lowland") Kayan, Kakhaung ("highland") Kayan
Gekho cluster: Gekho, Kadaw, Taungmying
Nagi (Nangki) Kayan
Latha ("North") Kayan, Zayein
Thamidai
Kayah (Karenni)
West Kayah, Manaw
Yingtalay
Manu-Bwe
Manu
Bwe
East Kayaw
West Kayaw
Bwe
Geba
Mopwa-Pwo-Sgaw
Mopwa, Blimaw
Pwo-Sgaw
Pwo
Sgaw cluster
Sgaw
Monebwa, Paku
Thalebwa

Luangthongkum (2019)
Luangthongkum (2019) recognizes three branches of Proto-Karen, namely Northern, Central, and Southern, but is agnostic about how the three branches fit together.

Karenic
Northern
Northern Pa-O
Southern Pa-O
Central
Kayan
Kayah
Western Bwe (Blimaw, Geba)
Kayaw
Southern
Northern Sgaw
Southern Sgaw
Northern Pwo
Southern Pwo

Note: Western Bwe Karen (Blimaw, Geba) preserves the implosives or preglottalised obstruents ɓ/ʔb and ɗ/ʔd, as well as voiceless sonorants such as hn, hl, and so forth.

Reconstruction

References

 George van Driem (2001) Languages of the Himalayas: An Ethnolinguistic Handbook of the Greater Himalayan Region. Brill.

Further reading
 Dawkins, Erin and Audra Phillips (2009) A Sociolinguistic Survey of Pwo Karen in Northern Thailand Chiang Mai: Payap University.
 Dawkins, Erin and Audra Phillips (2009) An investigation of intelligibility between West-Central Thailand Pwo Karen and Northern Pwo Karen. Chiang Mai: Payap University.
 Manson, Ken. 2010. A bibliography of Karen linguistics

Reconstructions
Jones, Robert B. Jr. 1961. Karen linguistic studies: Description, comparison, and texts. University of California Publications in Linguistics 25. Berkeley and Los Angeles: University of California Press.
Luangthongkum, Theraphan. 2013. A view on Proto-Karen phonology and lexicon. Unpublished ms. contributed to STEDT.

Vocabulary lists
Shintani, Tadahiko. 2014. The Zayein language. Linguistic survey of Tay cultural area (LSTCA) no. 102. Tokyo: Research Institute for Languages and Cultures of Asia and Africa (ILCAA).
Shintani, Tadahiko. 2015. The Kadaw language. Linguistic survey of Tay cultural area (LSTCA) no. 106. Tokyo: Research Institute for Languages and Cultures of Asia and Africa (ILCAA).
Shintani, Tadahiko. 2016. The Nangki language. Linguistic survey of Tay cultural area (LSTCA) no. 109. Tokyo: Research Institute for Languages and Cultures of Asia and Africa (ILCAA).

External links 
 Free Anglo-Karen Dictionary
 A grammar of the Sgaw Karen
 Drum Publication Group—Online Sgaw Karen language materials. Includes an online English - Sgaw Karen Dictionary.
 Karen Teacher Working Group—Several Karen fonts available for download.